Justice Meenakshi Madan Rai (born 12 July 1964) is an Indian Judge. She has served as Acting Chief Justice of Sikkim High Court.

References 

Indian women
Indian judges
Living people
1964 births
Rai people